Auglaize Township is one of eleven townships in Camden County, Missouri, USA.  As of the 2000 census, its population was 2,227.

Auglaize Township was established in 1841.

Geography
It contains ten cemeteries: Brown, Campground, Chalfant, Dodson, Hammer, Hillhouse, Knight, Lewis, Sharp and Traw.

The streams of Conns Creek, Mill Creek, Murphy Creek, Sellars Creek, Shakerag Creek, Stoops Branch, Stoutland Creek and Stoutland Creek run through this township.

References

 USGS Geographic Names Information System (GNIS)

External links
 US-Counties.com
 City-Data.com

Townships in Camden County, Missouri
Townships in Missouri